Mohammad Sabbir Rahman (born 22 November 1988) is a Bangladeshi cricketer. He is from Rajshahi and besides the national team, he plays for Rajshahi Division and the BPL. He is an all-rounder: a right-handed batsman and legbreak bowler. He was the highest run scorer for a test playing nation in the 2016 Asia Cup and became man of the tournament. He captained the Bangladesh Under 19's team. He made his international debut for Bangladesh in February 2014.

International career

One Day International
Sabbir made his One Day International (ODI) debut for Bangladesh against Zimbabwe on 21 November 2014.

On 23 February 2019, against New Zealand, Sabbir scored his maiden ODI century which was also his first ever century in international cricket.

Asia Cup 2016
Sabbir was the top run scorer for Bangladesh in 2016 Asia Cup. Sabbir was outstanding with the batting as he scored 176 runs with an average of 44.00 and strike rate of 123.94, and played a major part of Bangladeshi batting unit and was selected as 'Player of the series'. He scored a fifty in the match against Sri Lanka, where it was the first time that Bangladesh beat Sri Lanka in a T20I.

Test cricket
On 20 October 2016, Sabbir made his Test debut  against England.

2019 Cricket World Cup
In April 2019, Sabbir was named in Bangladesh’s 15 man squad for 2019 Cricket World Cup.

BPL
He once held the record for the highest ever individual score in Bangladesh Premier League (BPL) history (122), until the record was beaten by Chris Gayle in the 2017 edition of the BPL.

In October 2018, he was named in the squad for the Sylhet Sixers team, following the draft for the 2018–19 Bangladesh Premier League. In November 2019, he was selected to play for the Cumilla Warriors in the 2019–20 Bangladesh Premier League.

Controversies 

On 29 November 2016, Rahman, along with Al-Amin Hossain, were fined 30% and 50% of their BPL contracts respectively by the Bangladesh Cricket Board (BCB) for "serious off-field disciplinary breaches".

On 1 January 2018, Rahman was stripped of his central contract, barred from playing international cricket for 6 months, and fined Tk 20 lakh (US$25,000) by the BCB for an incident that happened on 21 December 2017 during Rajshahi Division's first class match against Dhaka Metropolis. During the incident, Rahman went behind a sight screen and assaulted a young boy who had made a noise towards him during an innings break on the second day of the match. Rahman was questioned by the match referee on day three, at which point Rahman got "physically aggressive".

On 28 July, the BCB started investigations after Rahman allegedly threatened two fans on Facebook following an ODI loss to West Indies. The incident started when one of the fans made a sarcastic comment regarding Rahman's form on the account of "Shabbir Rahaman Roman", which is believed to be Rahman's personal Facebook account. Rahman then responded by allegedly sending messages containing foul language and threats of physical harm. In September 2018, the BCB recommended a six-month suspension from international cricket.

On 16 June 2021, Sheikh Jamal Dhanmondi Club lodged a complaint against Rahman, who was playing for Legends of Rupganj, for allegedly racially abusing and throwing stones at Elias Sunny, who was playing for Sheikh Jamal Dhanmondi. The alleged incident took place during a T20 match between Sheikh Jamal Dhanmondi and Old DOHS Sports Club during the Dhaka Premier Division T20 League at the Bangladesh Krira Shikkha Protisthan (BKSP) ground no. 3 in Dhaka. Rahman, who had a game against Partex Sporting Club at the BKSP 4 ground later in the day, abused and threw stones at Sunny, who was fielding at the time, while Rahman was standing outside the boundary. This incident caused the game to be paused for a few minutes. Sunny has alleged that this is not an isolated incident and that this is a continuation of a previous incident where Rahman had racially abused Sunny while the two were playing against each other in a previous match. The Cricket Committee of Dhaka Metropolis (CCDM) is investigating this incident. Following the investigation, Rahman, along with Sheikh Jamal Dhanmondi manager Sultan Mahmud, was fined Tk 50,000 (US$590).

References

External links
 

1991 births
Living people
Bangladeshi cricketers
Bangladesh Test cricketers
Bangladesh One Day International cricketers
Bangladesh Twenty20 International cricketers
Rajshahi Division cricketers
Asian Games medalists in cricket
Cricketers at the 2010 Asian Games
Cricketers at the 2015 Cricket World Cup
Cricketers at the 2014 Asian Games
Fortune Barishal cricketers
Prime Bank Cricket Club cricketers
Prime Doleshwar Sporting Club cricketers
Kala Bagan Cricket Academy cricketers
Bangladesh North Zone cricketers
Barisal Division cricketers
Bangladesh under-23 cricketers
Bangladesh A cricketers
Rajshahi Royals cricketers
Sylhet Strikers cricketers
Peshawar Zalmi cricketers
Asian Games gold medalists for Bangladesh
Medalists at the 2010 Asian Games
Asian Games bronze medalists for Bangladesh
Medalists at the 2014 Asian Games
American International University-Bangladesh alumni
People from Rajshahi District
South Asian Games gold medalists for Bangladesh
South Asian Games medalists in cricket